Max Duttenhofer (May 20, 1843 in Rottweil – August 14, 1903 in Tübingen, full name: Max Wilhelm Heinrich Duttenhofer, 1896: Max von Duttenhofer) was a German entrepreneur and industrialist. His factory invented smokeless gunpowder.

Life

In 1863 Max took over a powder mill from his father, from which the gunpowder factory Rottweil emerged. In 1884 he achieved a major breakthrough; smokeless gunpowder.

In 1890, Duttenhofer was one of the three founders of Daimler-Motoren-Gesellschaft.

Duttenhofer was a member of the board of the Pan-German League.

He died of a heart attack in 1903.

References

1843 births
1903 deaths
Businesspeople from Baden-Württemberg
German industrialists
People from Rottweil (district)